Carlos Alfredo Vecchio DeMari (born 6 June 1969) is a Venezuelan lawyer, politician and social activist, designated as Ambassador to the US by Juan Guaidó in January 2019 during the 2019 Venezuelan presidential crisis. His Credential Letter was accepted by U.S. President Donald Trump on April 9, 2019.

Early life and education
Vecchio was born on 6 June 1969 in Caripe, Monagas state, Venezuela, the youngest of three children, to Maria Teresa Demari de Vecchio, a teacher, and Rafael Vecchio, a political activist and three-term council person for Caripe.  He moved to  Caracas in 1987, studied at the Central University of Venezuela, and earned his law degree in 1992.

Legal career
From 1994 to 1998, Vecchio was a legal consult for Venezuela's state-run oil company, PDVSA.

He did postgraduate studies in law at Georgetown University and public administration at Harvard University,  where he was a Fulbright scholar at the Kennedy School of Government. Vecchio then returned to work as a tax manager for ExxonMobil in Venezuela.

Political career

In 2006, Vecchio grew opposed to the economic policy of the Hugo Chávez administration and began to think about being involved in Venezuelan politics. When Chávez expropriated ExxonMobil's assets within Venezuela, Vecchio's boss offered him a position in Qatar that included a pay increase, an assigned house and car, a company share package and more benefits. Vecchio said he immediately declined the offer and decided at that point to become involved in politics.

Vecchio later helped found the social-democratic Popular Will political party with Leopoldo López and Guaidó. With López imprisoned by the Venezuelan government, Vecchio was serving as leader of the party, when he was charged with incitement to violence.  He went into hiding, and later sought exile in the US.

In January 2019, Vecchio was named by Juan Guaidó, and accepted by U.S. Secretary of State Mike Pompeo, as Chargé d'Affaires of the Government of Venezuela to the United States. In that capacity he has participated in efforts to remove Maduro.  He told the Washington Diplomat that the outgoing Maduro embassy staff had taken all valuables from the Washington Embassy as they left. “They dismantled everything, but we need to recover all of it legally because I want to have in the official record how we received those assets, to show the Venezuelan people what they did.”

Michael Shifter told The Washington Diplomat that  Vecchio is "extremely impressive and sharp ... He’s got the background, skills and temperament for the job ...  he’s level-headed and realistic, and he’s been in this fight for a long time." The director of the Adrienne Arsht Latin America Center, Jason Marczak, said "he’s eloquent and articulate, and he’s able to maneuver in different circles", and that he will need to educate "folks like Bernie Sanders and others on the Hill who have started becoming critical of U.S. policy there."

During an appearance on the BBC Four Beyond 100 Days news programme on 30 April 2019, the programme hosts referred to Vecchio as Venezuela's "Ambassador to the US", rather than as the US-recognized Chargé d'Affaires.

Recognition
Vecchio is a 2013 fellow of the Yale University Maurice R. Greenberg World Fellows Program.

Publications

References

Notes

External links

 Opposition leaders at risk, Yale fellows
 From Yale to jail? Yale alumni magazine
 Wanted in Venezuela, Yale, The Politic

1969 births
Living people
Yale University alumni
Harvard Kennedy School alumni
Venezuelan people of French descent
Popular Will politicians
People of the Crisis in Venezuela
Ambassadors of Venezuela to the United States
Venezuelan exiles